This article relates to the Judge, for the actor see K. N. Singh

Kamal Narain Singh (13 December 1926 – 8 September 2022) was the 22nd Chief Justice of India. He was educated at L.R.L.A. High School in Sirsa and Ewing Christian College in Allahabad and was a graduate of the University of Allahabad. At 17 days, his tenure as chief justice is the shortest.

Legal career
As a lawyer, Singh practiced civil, constitutional and taxation law since 1957. His first judicial appointment was as Additional Judge of the Allahabad High Court in 1970 and Permanent Judge in 1972. He joined the Supreme Court in 1986 and served as Chief Justice of India from 25 November 1991 until 12 December 1991. He was honored with "Proud Past Alumni" by the University of Allahabad Alumni Association.

References

External links
Bio at India Supreme Court Page

1926 births
2022 deaths
20th-century Indian judges
20th-century Indian lawyers
Chief justices of India